Stepan Surenovich Spandaryan (April 2, 1906, Moscow - 1987, Moscow) was a Soviet-Armenian basketball player, coach, one of the founders of the Soviet basketball. Honored Master of Sports of the USSR (1943). Honored coach of the USSR (1957).

Since 1947 Stepan Spandaryan on coaching. In 1947 he was the assistant coach of the men's team of the USSR, won on his debut continental championship title in Europe.

In 1951-1952 and 1956-1962 he headed the coaching staff of the men's team of the USSR. During these years, the USSR national team won four times at the European Championships (1951, 1957, 1959, 1961) and three times became silver medalist of the Olympic Games (1952, 1956, 1960). In 1959, the USSR national team was close to winning the world title, but for political reasons refused to go to the match against a team from Taiwan and was disqualified.

In the 1965-1966 year, Stepan Spandaryan coached the men's team in Chile. Later he worked in the department of the Sports Committee of the USSR basketball. Over the years, he was a member and Chairman of the Presidium of the Basketball Federation of the USSR, the chairman of the All-Union Council of coaching.

The son of well-known literary critic, essayist and leader of the Russian revolutionary movement Suren Spandaryan. Wife - Soviet athlete and basketball player, champion and record holder USSR Ella Mitsis (1912-2002).

See also 
 List of FIBA EuroBasket winning head coaches

References

External links
 Профиль на сайте БК «Динамо» (фото)

1906 births
1987 deaths
Honoured Masters of Sport of the USSR
Merited Coaches of the Soviet Union
Soviet men's basketball players
BC Dynamo Moscow players
Soviet basketball coaches
Burials at Novodevichy Cemetery